Hugo Machado (3 July 1923 – 8 July 2015) was an Uruguayan cyclist. He competed in the individual and team road race events at the 1952 Summer Olympics. Machado was born in Rocha on 3 July 1923. He died in Montevideo on 8 July 2015, at the age of 92.

References

External links
 

1923 births
2015 deaths
Cyclists at the 1952 Summer Olympics
Olympic cyclists of Uruguay
Uruguayan male cyclists
People from Rocha, Uruguay